Pension insurance contract is an insurance contract that specifies pension plan contributions to an insurance undertaking in exchange for which the pension plan benefits will be paid when the members reach a specified retirement age or on earlier exit of members from the plan.

See also
Pension fund

Insurance
Types of insurance